The 'Shan-e-Khuda' mango (translated "God's magnificence") is a late-season mango cultivar grown in Pakistan, specifically the Multan and Rahim Yar Khan districts.

Description 
The fruit is sweet and ripens in October and November, after most varieties have finished.

The thick skin of Shan-e-Khuda gives it a long shelf life and high export value. It can be found in four colors – red, purple, green, and yellow. It is sometimes called 'Sun Session' because the more sun it receives, the more colors are produced during its ripening season.

See also 
List of mango cultivars

References 

Mango cultivars
Mango cultivars of Pakistan